Ab Kaseh (also Romanized as Āb Kāseh and Āb Kāsseh) is a village in Jahangiri Rural District, in the Central District of Masjed Soleyman County, Khuzestan Province, Iran. At the 2006 census, its population was 111, in 21 families.

References 

Populated places in Masjed Soleyman County